This is a list of members of the sixth Free State Provincial Legislature, as elected in the election of 8 May 2019 and taking into account changes in membership since the election.

Current composition

|-style="background:#e9e9e9;"
!colspan="2" style="text-align:left"| Party !! style="text-align:center"| Seats 
|-
|  || 19
|-
|  || 6
|-
|  || 4 
|-
|  || 1 
|-
|colspan="2" style="text-align:left"| Total || style="text-align:right"| 30 
|}

Graphical representation
This is a graphical comparison of party strengths as they are in the 6th Free State Provincial Legislature.

Note this is not the official seating plan of the Free State Provincial Legislature.

Members

References

Legislature